Vladimir Ivanovich Bulavin (born 11 February 1953) is a Russia military and security official currently appointed as the Head of the Federal Customs Service of the Russian Federation.

Biography 
Bulavin was born Lipetsk Oblast, Russia.

Before graduating in Academy of the Federal Security Service, he had worked with Voskhod as a constructor engineer in 1977 and in 1977, he joined State security commission serving in the Russian administration office in Ministry of Security and Administration of the Federal Counter-intelligence Service in 1979 and Administration of the Federal Security Service of Novgorod Region and was also presidential plenipotentiary representative of Northwest Federal district by Vladimir Putin.

On 25 February 2023, the European Union imposed sanctions against Bulavin due to his efforts to undermine trade and customs restrictions by securing parallel imports into Russia, and for exercising direct authority over customs processes and imposing Russia's customs code in the illegally annexed territories of Donetsk, Luhansk, Kherson, and Zaporizhzhia.

Notes 

1953 births
Living people
People from Lipetsk Oblast
KGB officers
Russian individuals subject to the U.S. Department of the Treasury sanctions